Westmont High School, or WHS, is a public four-year high school located in Westmont, a western suburb of Chicago, Illinois, in the United States. It is part of Westmont Community Unit School District 201.  The student population of 450 students and building size are much smaller than adjacent public high schools such as Downers Grove North and Hinsdale Central.

History
The school was created as part of the newly formed CUSD 201 in Westmont in 1972, and first opened for education in September 1974.

The community approved building the new high school in 1973, and the current Westmont High School building opened in October 1976.  The school mascot, the Sentinel, is a sentry, or guard wearing a uniform of the school colors, burgundy and gold.  The name was chosen via submissions to the school board. Sentinels represents the fact that Westmont was the highest point in the Chicago area, and hence a position a Sentinel would take.

Administration
Westmont High School is part of the Community Unit School District 201.

Demographics 
In 2010, Westmont High School enrolled 573 students, 75.9% of whom were White, 9% of whom were Black, 8.8% of whom were Hispanic, and 3.7% were Asian/Pacific Islander.  Low-income students comprised 29.3% of the student body; 2.4% had limited English proficiency.  The drop-out rate was 0.4% and the chronic truancy rate was 0.2%, which are both slightly better than the state average. The attendance rate was 91.9%.

Academics
In 2010, Westmont had an average composite ACT score of 21.4, and graduated 89.9% of its senior class. The average class size is 22.5. Westmont has made Adequate Yearly Progress on the Prairie State Achievement Examination, a state test part of the No Child Left Behind Act.

Athletics
Westmont competes in the Metro Suburban Conference and Illinois High School Association. Its mascot is the Sentinel.

In 2021 the Westmont High School scholastic bowl team won both the NAQT Traditional Public Small School National Championship and Very Small School National Championship. The team consisted of Pranav Viswanath, Akshar Goyal, Lily Sakalys, Mark Michalik, Michael Smith, Stephen Michalik, Omer Mohsin, and Diana Zheng. The team was coached by head coach Tom Demay and assistant coaches Nathan Chamberlain and Margaret Scheidel.

Notable Alum

Sarah Jindra - WGN Reporter

Pierre Pierce - Former Iowa Hawkeyes Basketball Player

Galla Jayadev (Jay Galla) - Indian politician and industrialist in India

Joe Getty of Armstrong and Getty - Radio Talk Show Host

Pete Leinweber - Big Ten Network Recruiting Co-Host 

Michael J. Fleck - Chemist, Inventor and Lawyer

Reggie Benjamin - Musician, record label owner

References

External links
 School website
 District 201 website

Public high schools in Illinois
Westmont, Illinois
Schools in DuPage County, Illinois